Keith James (born 5 November 1934) is a South African long-distance runner. He competed in the marathon at the 1960 Summer Olympics.

References

1934 births
Living people
Athletes (track and field) at the 1960 Summer Olympics
South African male long-distance runners
South African male marathon runners
Olympic athletes of South Africa
Sportspeople from Johannesburg